Find Me Before I Die A Lonely Death.com is the third album from New Zealand electronic band Minuit.

The URL in the album title, findmebeforeidiealonelydeath.com, was a social networking site, created by the band, for inanimate objects and pets.

Three singles have been released from the album, "25 Bucks," "Aotearoa," and "Wayho."

The song, "I'm Still Dancing" was used in an episode of Grey's Anatomy which was aired in the US on 5 February 2010. The song, "Aotearoa" was used in an episode of Bones which was aired in the US on 3 February 2011. The song "Aotearoa" was also used in the Syfy adaptation of the show Being Human in the season 2 episode "Do You Really Want To Hurt Me?"

The artwork for the album was created by lead singer, Ruth Carr, from 100s & 1000s in the shape of a world map.

Track listing 
 "Wayho"
 "Run Run"
 "25 Bucks"
 "Queen Of The Flies"
 "I Hate You"
 "Maserati"
 "Aotearoa"
 "Yeah Yeah"
 "10ft Tall"
 "Vampires"
 "Daddy-O"
 "I'm Still Dancing"
 "Long Live Zero"
 "Everyone From Everywhere"

References 

2009 albums
Minuit (band) albums